Norm Berketa (born 23 August 1963 in Toronto, Ontario) is a Canadian character actor and voice actor based in Ottawa.

Biography
Norman Mikeal Berketa was born in Toronto, Ontario in 1963, but came to Ottawa in 1969.

He is best known for his acting roles in television and films such as H2O, Beyond Borders, Lost Junction, Big Wolf on Campus, Secret Agent Man and Are You Afraid of the Dark?. More recently he has done voice-overs for animation such as Toad Patrol, Hoze Houndz and Zeroman.

Prior to acting, Berketa was interested in music in the entertainment industry and started-out playing drums and guitar in the rock bands Al's Garage and Silent Q. After a successful summer with Silent Q, the band re-structured and became the Initiatives.

After a short while Berketa began his solo music endeavour by purchasing some analog recording equipment and building an analog studio. To date he has over 300 original songs to his credit, and he has fully converted his studio to digital.

Eight years later, in 1996, he left retail management and began doing dinner theatre and radio in Ottawa. In August 1998, he secured his first TV role and has been acting ever since.

Berketa currently lives in Ottawa with his wife and two children.

Selected filmography

Arthur (1996, TV series) – (voice)
Soldier of Fortune, Inc. (1997, TV series) – Security Guard
Freaky Stories (1997, TV series) – (voice)
Princess Sissi (1997, TV series) – (voice)
Patrol 03 (1997, TV series) – (voice)
Animal Crackers (1997, TV series) – (voice)
The Country Mouse and the City Mouse Adventures (1997-1999, TV series) – (voice)
Jim Button (1998, TV series) – (voice)
Flight Squad (1998, TV series) – (voice)
Big Wolf on Campus (1999, TV series) – Mr. Shashefsky
The Collectors (1999, TV movie) – Bank Manager
Hoze Houndz (1999, TV series) – Clock (voice)
Misguided Angels (1999, TV series) – Honest Fred
Kevin Spencer (1999, TV series) – Mr. Franklin (voice)
Tommy and Oscar (1999, TV series) – (voice)
Are You Afraid of the Dark? (1999, TV series)
Nuremberg (2000, TV Mini-Series) – American Photographer
Jackie Bouvier Kennedy Onassis (2000, TV movie) – Young Maurice Tempelsman
The Kiss of Debt (2000) – Father Gardenia
For Better or For Worse (2000, TV series) – (voice)
Secret Agent Man (2000, TV series)
House of Luk (2001) – Man in Car
Untalkative Bunny (2001, TV series) – (voice)
The Score (2001) – Bureaucrat Official
After Amy (2001, TV movie) – Michael O'Donnell
Protection (2001) – Ernst
The Endless Grind (2002) (TV series) – Park Employee
The Sum of All Fears (2002) – American Scientist
Toad Patrol (2002, TV series) – (voice)
Fix and Foxi (2002, TV series) – (voice)
Lost Junction (2003) – Mr. Thompson
Beyond Borders (2003) – Police Officer
The Secret World of Benjamin Bear (2003, TV series) – (voice)
The Eggs (2004, TV series) – (voice)
Zeroman (2004, TV series) – Mayor MacWald / Bucky Dentyne (voice)
Mann to Mann (2004) (TV series) – Ventriloquist
H2O (2004, TV miniseries) – Elliot Cressman
A Taste of Jupiter (2005, TV movie) – Security Guard
Deadly Isolation (2005, TV movie) – Daniel Garrett
Faireez (2005, TV series) – (voice)
Proof of Lies (2006, TV movie) – Campus Cop
Rumours (2006, TV series) – Gary
I Me Wed (2007) (TV movie) – Supplier
Custody (2007, TV movie) – Security Guard
My Daughter's Secret (2007, TV movie) – Albert
Jack Brooks: Monster Slayer (2007) – Man in Hardware Store
A Near Death Experience (2008, TV movie) – Detective Jeff Mader
Sophie (2008, TV series) – Ventriloquist
Die (2010) – Security Guard
Eddie: The Sleepwalking Cannibal (2012) – Bartender
Tell the World (2016) – Exeter Pastor

External links

1963 births
Canadian male film actors
Canadian male television actors
Canadian male voice actors
Canadian rock bass guitarists
Canadian rock guitarists
Canadian male guitarists
Canadian rock drummers
Canadian male drummers
Canadian male singers
Living people
Male actors from Ottawa
Male actors from Toronto
Musicians from Ottawa
Musicians from Toronto
Male bass guitarists